World Classic Championship at Laguna National was a golf tournament on the Asian Tour. It was played only once, from 12–15 November 2015 at Laguna National Golf and Country Club, in Singapore.

Winners

See also
The Championship at Laguna National

References

External links
Coverage on the Asian Tour's official site

Former Asian Tour events
Golf tournaments in Singapore
2015 establishments in Singapore